Linschoten is a Dutch surname.

Notable people
Notable people with this surname include:
 Adriaen Cornelisz van Linschoten (1590–1677), Dutch painter
 Jan Huyghen van Linschoten (1563–1611), Dutch merchant and historian
 Robin Linschoten (born 1956), Dutch politician

See also
 Linschoten (disambiguation)

References